Davit Iashvili (born 1 September 1992) is a professional Georgian-born Ukrainian football defender who plays for FC Obolon-Brovar Kyiv in the Ukrainian Second League.

Iashvili is a product of the youth team systems of RVUFK Kyiv. But he then signed a contract with FC Obolon in 2011. On 3 December 2012, he signed a 3.5-year deal with FC Dynamo Kyiv until 30 June 2016.

He was called up to play for the Ukraine national under-21 football team by trainer Pavlo Yakovenko in a friendly match against Denmark and Portugal in October 2012.

References

External links
Profile at FFU Official Site (Ukr)

1992 births
Living people
Ukrainian footballers
FC Obolon-Brovar Kyiv players
Ukrainian Premier League players
Association football defenders